Hiroshi Ogawa may refer to:

, former Japanese professional player
, former Japanese professional player
, Japanese baseball player and convicted criminal
, Japanese governor of Fukuoka Prefecture
, Japanese animator
, Japanese Olympic skier